The Quincy Gems are a collegiate summer league baseball team located in Quincy, Illinois.

The Gems were originally a part of the Central Illinois Collegiate League and joined the Prospect League with several other CICL teams prior to the 2009 season. The team's original owners, the Quincy Civic Center Authority, sold the Gems to its current owners in September 2014 for $120,000.

The Gems currently play in the Prospect League's Western Conference in the Great River Division along with the Burlington Bees, Clinton LumberKings, and Normal CornBelters.

Stadium
The Gems play at QU Stadium, a 2,500 seat facility owned and operated by Quincy University. The facility was built in 1938 and is located at 1800 Sycamore Street in Quincy.

Seasons

Roster

Notable alumni

 Adam Rosales (2003–2004)
 Joe Thatcher (2002)
 Bryan Bullington (2000)
 Dan Meyer (2000)
 Neal Cotts (1999–2000)
 Josh Rabe (1998–1999)
 J. J. Furmaniak (1998–1999)
 Sam Coonrod (2012)

References

External links 
Quincy Gems

1996 establishments in Illinois
Amateur baseball teams in Illinois
Prospect League teams
Sports teams in Quincy, Illinois
Baseball teams established in 1996